Valvin muscat is a hybrid grape variety for use in white wine production.  It was developed by grape breeder Bruce Reisch at the Cornell University New York State Agricultural Experiment Station and released on July 7, 2006.  

Valvin muscat is the result of a cross between Muscat Ottonel (vitis vinifera) and hybrid Muscat du Moulin (Couderc 299–35).  It has distinct muscat grape characteristics.

References

External links 
New hybrid grapes released from Cornell University

White wine grape varieties
Hybrid grape varieties
American wine